Anda Railway Station is a railway station on the Binzhou Railway in  Heilongjiang, China.

Railway stations in Heilongjiang
Stations on the Harbin–Qiqihar Intercity Railway